South Korea plans to meet 20 percent of its total electricity consumption with renewables by 2030, the energy ministry said the plan called for adding 30.8 GW of solar power generating capacity and 16.5 GW of wind power capacity.

Statistics

See also
Energy in South Korea
Wind power in South Korea
Renewable energy in South Korea
Renewable energy by country

References